Rhizodus (root tooth) is an extinct genus of basal, finned tetrapodomorphs (the group of sarcopterygians that contains modern tetrapods and their extinct relatives). It belonged to Rhizodontida, one of the earliest-diverging tetrapodomorph clades. Two valid species have been described, both of which lived during the Early Carboniferous epoch. The type species R. hibberti is known from the Viséan stage of the United Kingdom, whereas the species R. serpukhovensis is from the Serpukhovian of Russia. Some fossils referred to the genus Rhizodus have also been found in North America.

Description

The most notable characteristics of Rhizodus, compared to other giant rhizodonts such as Barameda, were the two  fangs located near the front of its jaws, followed by other teeth scaling downwards in size. It fed on small to medium-sized amphibians, using its teeth to kill prey and rip it into digestible sizes, rather than swallowing prey whole like other, smaller-toothed sarcopterygians.

Fossil skin imprints show that Rhizodus had large, plate-like scales, similar to those found on modern day arapaima.

Diet
The diet of Rhizodus''' included medium-sized fish and tetrapods. It has been proposed that Rhizodus'' lunged at terrestrial, shorebound prey, just like a modern-day crocodile.

References

Rhizodonts
Prehistoric lobe-finned fish genera
Viséan genera
Serpukhovian life
Carboniferous United Kingdom
Carboniferous North America
Fossils of Great Britain
Fossils of Russia
Fossil taxa described in 1840
Taxa named by Richard Owen